Thomas Christian Murphy (born August 27, 1979) is a former Major League Baseball outfielder. He played for the Los Angeles Angels of Anaheim in 2006 and 2007.

Career
Murphy was a 1997 graduate of Charlotte High School in Punta Gorda, Florida. He is also an alumnus of Florida Atlantic University, where he played baseball for the Owls under head coach Kevin Cooney. In 1999, he played collegiate summer baseball with the Wareham Gatemen of the Cape Cod Baseball League.

Murphy was originally drafted by the Arizona Diamondbacks in the 50th round (1,427th overall) of the  Major League Baseball draft; he did not sign with them, however. He spent the next five seasons in the Angels' farm system, making his way through the minor leagues until the 2006 season.

Murphy made his Major League Baseball debut with the Angels on May 4, against the Detroit Tigers at Comerica Park in Detroit, Michigan. In his debut, Murphy went 2-for-4 with one RBI and scoring one run. On May 27, 2006, he hit his first home run, a solo shot versus the Baltimore Orioles off pitcher Adam Loewen.

On November 27, 2007, Murphy signed a minor league contract with the Washington Nationals. Murphy was assigned to the minor leagues and opted out of his contract on July 2, 2008; he went on to sign a minor league contract with the Florida Marlins, subsequently being assigned to Triple-A Albuquerque. He became a free agent at the end of the season and signed a minor league contract with the Kansas City Royals, for whom he played in 2009.

References

External links
MLB.com Player Profile

1979 births
Living people
Los Angeles Angels players
Baseball players from New York (state)
Florida Atlantic Owls baseball players
Charlotte High School (Punta Gorda, Florida) alumni
Major League Baseball outfielders
People from Suffern, New York
Boise Hawks players
Rancho Cucamonga Quakes players
Cedar Rapids Kernels players
Arkansas Travelers players
Salt Lake Bees players
Columbus Clippers players
Albuquerque Isotopes players
New Jersey Jackals players
Omaha Royals players
Wareham Gatemen players